Stary Dworek  is a village in the administrative district of Gmina Bledzew, within Międzyrzecz County, Lubusz Voivodeship, in western Poland.

The village has an approximate population of 250.

References

Stary Dworek